Avature is a privately-held global human capital management software as a service company. It is incorporated in London, United Kingdom, and operates subsidiaries in Argentina, Australia, China, Germany, Spain, and the United States. 

Avature offers solutions in recruiting and talent management technology. According to Avature's website, the platform is used by over 650 customers in 160 countries and 30+ languages. As of 2022, the company had 1384 employees.

History 

Dimitri Boylan, co-founder and former CEO of HotJobs founded Avature in 2005 as a recruiting outsourcing service provider. Avature provided services to large organizations and global staffing firms in New York and Buenos Aires. In September 2008, the company commercially released its flagship product, Avature CRM, a client relationship management system for talent acquisition.

In 2012 Avature sold its recruiting services businesses to Korn Ferry and focused on software development. In subsequent years, the company’s product suite has expanded to include an applicant tracking system, as well as software for campus and events recruiting, onboarding, internal mobility, performance management, and contingent workforce management.

Awards and recognition 
2008 "a Top HR Product", Human Resource Executive Magazine 
2010 "Cool Vendor", Gartner
2012 "TekTonic Award for Talent Management", HRO Today
2018 "Top HR Product" for Avature Contingent Workforce Management (CWM), HR Executive Magazine
2018 "Top Women Leaders in SaaS list" for Avature CFO, AnaLaura Darino, The Software Report
2019 "Best Advance in Talent Acquisition Technology" gold medal, Brandon Hall Group
2020 No. 55 of "Top 100 Software Companies", The Software Report

References

Recruitment
Recruitment software
Customer relationship management software companies
As a service
Multinational companies